Lim Ju-eun (born January 7, 1988) is a South Korean actress.

Career
Lim Ju-eun is best known her roles in the horror thriller Soul (also known as Hon), the campus musical drama What's Up,  and the quirky rom-com Wild Romance. In 2014 she costarred in the web series One Sunny Day with So Ji-Sub.

In September 2018, Lim signed with new agency Hunus Entertainment.

In November 2022, Lim left Hunus Entertainment and signed with new agency SidusHQ.

Filmography

Television series

Film

Variety show

Music video

Awards and nominations

References

External links

 
 

Living people
1988 births
South Korean television actresses
South Korean film actresses
South Korean web series actresses